Drag-yab is a Sino-Tibetan language recently documented by Suzuki & Nyima (2018, 2019). It is spoken in the southern half of Zhag'yab County, Chamdo, eastern Tibet.

Suzuki & Nyima (2018) document the dialect of Drag-yab spoken in the village of Razi 热孜村 in Xiangdui Town 香堆镇, Zhag'yab County.

Names
Drag-yab is referred to by the Changdu Gazetteer (2005) as Zesong 则松话, and is reported by Changdu (2005) to be spoken in Zesong 则松乡 and Bari 巴日乡 townships of Zhag'yab County.

The language is also referred to as both sMa and rMa. Nyima & Suzuki (2019) report the autonym m̥a55 (or ma55), which is identical to the Larong autonym, also reported by them (m̥a55).

Jiang (2022) lists Mang 芒话 and Maji 玛吉话 as Drag-yab (Chaya 察雅) varieties.

Classification
Suzuki & Nyima (2018) note that Drag-yab is closely related to two other recently documented Sino-Tibetan languages of Chamdo, eastern Tibet, namely Lamo and Larong. Their relationship outside of this group, the Chamdo languages, within the Sino-Tibetan family is still uncertain.

Phonology 
Suzuki & Nyima (2018) report the following phonemes from the Razi dialect of Drag-yab.

Consonants: /ph, p, b, th, t, d, ʈh, ʈ, ɖ, kh, k, g, qh, q, ɢ, ʔ, tsh, ts, dz, tɕh, tɕ, dʑ, s, z, ɕ, ʑ, x, ɣ, χ, ʁ, h, ɦ, m, m̥, n, n̥, ȵ, ȵ̊, ŋ, ŋ̊, ɴ, ɴ̥, l, l̥, r, r̥, w, j/.

Vowels: /i, e, ɛ, a, ɑ, ɔ, o, u, ɯ, ʉ, ə, ɵ/. Suzuki & Nyima (2018) report that each vowel has a creaky and nasalized counterpart.

Tones are high and rising. The first two syllables of each word act as the tone bearing unit. The second syllable is occasionally out of the tone bearing unit.

Geographical distribution
Drag-yab is spoken in 6 townships, along different river valleys within the Lancang (Lachu) River watershed. These include Maiqu, Kaqu, Lasongqu, Guidaqu, and Changqu.

Byams mdun Town (Chinese: Xiangdui 香堆镇): mostly Drag-yab speakers
Dzongsar Township (Chinese: Zongsha 宗沙乡): mostly Drag-yab speakers
Palri Township (Chinese: Bari 巴日乡): all Drag-yab speakers
Khuda (Chinese: Kuoda 扩达乡): mostly Drag-yab speakers
Atshur Township (Chinese: Azi 阿孜乡): mostly Drag-yab speakers
Rongdrub Township (Chinese: Rongzhou 荣周乡): Drag-yab speakers are mainly located in Maidui Village

Drag-yab villages by township:

References

Unclassified Sino-Tibetan languages
Languages of China
Languages of Tibet